The 1978 New Mexico State Aggies football team was an American football team that represented New Mexico State University in the Missouri Valley Conference (MVC) during the 1978 NCAA Division I-A football season. In their first year under head coach Gil Krueger, the Aggies compiled a 6–5 record and finished as MVC champions. The team played its home games at Aggie Memorial Stadium in Las Cruces, New Mexico.

Schedule

References

New Mexico State
New Mexico State Aggies football seasons
Missouri Valley Conference football champion seasons
New Mexico State Aggies football